The Ethics of Ambiguity is Simone de Beauvoir's second major non-fiction work.  It was prompted by a lecture she gave in 1945, after which she claimed that it was impossible to base an ethical system on her partner Jean-Paul Sartre's major philosophical work Being and Nothingness. The following year, over a six-month period, she took on the challenge, publishing the resulting text first as installments in Les Temps modernes and then, in November 1947, as a book.

Contents 

The Ethics of Ambiguity consists of three parts and a short conclusion.

Part I 

"Ambiguity and Freedom," lays out the philosophical underpinnings of Beauvoir's stance on ethics.  She asserts that man is fundamentally free, a freedom that comes from his "nothingness," which is an essential aspect of his ability to be self-aware, to be conscious of himself: "... the nothingness which is at the heart of man is also the consciousness that he has of himself." But man is also a thing, a "facticity," an object for others. The ambiguity is that each of us is both subject and object, freedom and facticity. As free, we have the ability to take note of ourselves and choose what to do. As factic, we are constrained by physical limits, social barriers and the expectations and political power of others.

Beauvoir rejects any notion of an absolute goodness or moral imperative that exists on its own. "...there exists no absolute value before the passion of man, outside of it, in relation to which one might distinguish the useless from the useful." Values come only from our choices.

Human freedom can be only in concrete projects, not in the abstract. Freedom "requires the realization of concrete ends, of particular projects."

The types of particular content that are suitable are discussed in Part III.

Part II 

Part II, "Personal Freedom and Others," examines a number of different ways that people try to deny their freedom, as freedom can be uncomfortable and disquieting.  The freedom to choose entails the freedom to try to avoid one's freedom.  Before we can even do that, however, we start as children, who take the values of the adults around them as ready-made things.  She calls this the attitude of "seriousness," in which the child "escapes the anguish of freedom" by thinking of values as existing objectively, outside themselves, rather than as an expression of their freedom. Once past childhood, one can be a sub-man who avoids all questions of freedom and assumes themselves not free.  The next rung up the hierarchy is the serious man who "gets rid of his freedom by claiming to subordinate it to values which would be unconditioned," in effect reverting to a kind of childhood. Both the sub-man and the serious man refuse to recognize that they are free, in the sense of being able to choose their own values.

Several other types recognize their freedom, but misuse it.  The nihilist, having failed at life, decides not to try anything at all.  "Conscious of being unable to be anything, man then decides to be nothing. ... Nihilism is disappointed seriousness which has turned back upon itself." The adventurer is one who engages vigorously in various life projects, but without caring for the goal.  The adventurer "does not attach himself to the end at which he aims; only to his conquest. He likes action for its own sake." And he tramples on others in the process: "[T]he adventurer shares the nihilist’s contempt for men." Finally the passionate man cares enthusiastically about his goal, but shares a similar contempt for others: "Not intending his freedom for men, the passionate man does not recognize them as freedoms either. He will not hesitate to treat them as things."

And finally there is genuine freedom, which takes the excitement of the adventurer and the passion of the passionate man and includes with them a concern for other people, other freedoms, as well. "Passion is converted to genuine freedom only if one destines his existence to other existences."  "To will oneself free is also to will others free."

Part III 

Part III, "The Positive Aspect of Ambiguity," examines the intricacies and nuances of genuinely free action in the world.  It includes five sections.

Part III, Section 1, "The Aesthetic Attitude," criticizes the attitude of detached contemplation as being unworkable.

Part III, Section 2, "Freedom and Liberation," explores the evils of oppression and offers a number of trenchant observations about the relationship between the oppressor and the oppressed.  The oppressor recognizes the interdependence of people, but treats those of the oppressed class as things, not as free human existents in their own right.  To prevent them from rebelling, the oppressor tries to mystify them into thinking that the oppressive situation is just natural.  But it is not, and "the oppressed can fulfill his freedom as a man only in revolt ...."

Part III, Section 3, "The Antinomies of Action," examines the need for violence and its consequent moral quandaries.  "In order for a liberating action to be a thoroughly moral action, it would have to be achieved through a conversion of the oppressors: there would then be a reconciliation of all freedoms. But no one any longer dares to abandon himself today to these utopian reveries." Under what circumstances, then, is violence justified?  Under what circumstances may the oppressed treat the oppressors as less than fully human in order to secure their own liberation? Beauvoir considers in some detail the nuances and difficulties of such considerations.

Part III, Section 4, "The Present and the Future," treats the relationship of action in the present to achieve an uncertain goal in the future.  The determinism suggested by the dialectical materialism of Karl Marx is considered and criticized.

Part III, Section 5, "Ambiguity," returns to the originating theme of the work, that each individual is both radically free, able to transcend themselves, and factical, constrained by that which just is what it is.  How does one remain true to one's freedom while allowing others their own freedom, even if they make mistakes?  Are we justified in telling the truth when another person finds the truth unbearable?  We have to act in particular situations, "inventing an original solution" each time, but remembering that "man is man only through situations whose particularity is precisely a universal fact."

The brief Conclusion sums up Beauvoir's view of human freedom: "... we are absolutely free today if we choose to will our existence in its finiteness, a finiteness which is open on the infinite." She ends with a call for us to realize and act on this fundamental truth of our existence.

References

Sources

 Bergoffen, Debra. "Simone de Beauvoir". Stanford Encyclopedia of Philosophy. Retrieved on 1 November 2011.
 De Beauvoir, Simone. The Ethics of Ambiguity. Marxists Internet Archive. Another version, not as well proof-read, is here at Webster University. Retrieved on 2 November 2011.
 
 Meacham, Bill. "Simone de Beauvoir: A Philosophy of Liberation". bmeacham.com. Retrieved on 2 November 2011.
 Mussett, Shannon. "Simone de Beauvoir (1908–1986)". Internet Encyclopedia of Philosophy. Retrieved on 2 November 2011.

1947 essays
Essays by Simone de Beauvoir
Ethics literature
Works originally published in Les Temps modernes